Adrian Napierała (born 16 February 1982) is a Polish football manager and a former player. He is the manager of MKS Lyńdźiny.

Career

Club
In February 2003, he moved to Piotrcovia Piotrków Trybunalski.

In June 2004, he joined Jagiellonia Białystok on a four-year contract.

In July 2008, he left Jagiellonia for GKS Katowice.

International
He was part of the Polish U-16 team that placed second at the UEFA U-16 Championship in 1999 as well as the U-18 team that won the UEFA U-18 Championship in 2001.

References

External links
 

1982 births
Sportspeople from Gorzów Wielkopolski
Living people
Polish footballers
Poland youth international footballers
Association football defenders
Aluminium Konin players
ŁKS Łódź players
Pogoń Szczecin players
Jagiellonia Białystok players
GKS Katowice players
Puszcza Niepołomice players
Ekstraklasa players
I liga players
II liga players
Polish football managers